Dirk Galuba (born 28 August 1940 in Schneidemühl) is a German television actor.

Selected filmography
1972: Tears of Blood
1976: Derrick - Season 3, Episode 5: "Schock"
1976: 
1977: Derrick - Season 4, Episode 9: "Inkasso"
1978: The Rider on the White Horse
1979: Derrick - Season 6, Episode 6: "Tandem"
1979: Derrick - Season 6, Episode 9: "Ein Kongreß in Berlin"
1980: Derrick - Season 7, Episode 11: "Pricker"
1981: Lili Marleen
1982: Derrick - Season 9, Episode 7: "Hausmusik"
1985: Derrick - Season 12, Episode 7: "Ein unheimlicher Abgang"
1999/2001: Die Rote Meile (TV series)
2001: Band of Brothers (TV series)
2003: Rosamunde Pilcher: Paradies der Träume (TV episode)
2005: Sturm der Liebe (TV series)
2006: The Cloud

External links

 
 Marc Rosenberg Management 

1940 births
Living people
People from Piła
People from the Province of Pomerania
German male television actors
20th-century German male actors
21st-century German male actors